Dmitriyevo is a rural locality (a village) in Nikolo-Ramenskoye Rural Settlement, Cherepovetsky District, Vologda Oblast, Russia. The population was 71 as of 2002.

Geography 
Zarechye is the nearest rural locality.

References 

Rural localities in Cherepovetsky District